Patrick James O'Gorman was an Irish Fine Gael politician. A shopkeeper, he was elected to Dáil Éireann as a Teachta Dála (TD) for the Cork East constituency at the 1948 general election, and was re-elected at the 1951 general election. He lost his seat at the 1954 general election but was subsequently nominated by the Taoiseach to the 8th Seanad. He was an unsuccessful candidate at the 1957 general election.

References

Year of birth missing
Year of death missing
Fine Gael TDs
Members of the 13th Dáil
Members of the 14th Dáil
Members of the 8th Seanad
Politicians from County Cork
Nominated members of Seanad Éireann
Fine Gael senators